Same-sex marriage in Sweden has been legal since 1 May 2009 following the adoption of a gender-neutral marriage law by the Riksdag on 1 April 2009. Sweden was the seventh country in the world to open marriage to same-sex couples nationwide. Existing registered partnerships remain in force and can be converted to a marriage if the partners so desire, either through a written application or through a formal ceremony. New registered partnerships are no longer able to be entered into and marriage is now the only legally recognized form of union for couples regardless of sex.

On 22 October 2009, the governing board of the Church of Sweden voted 176–62 in favour of allowing its priests to wed same-sex couples in new gender-neutral church ceremonies, including the use of the term marriage. Same-sex marriages have been performed by the church since 1 November 2009.

History

Cohabitation
In 1987, Sweden established a statutory relationship protection scheme separate from marriage for all unmarried cohabiting couples, including same-sex couples. It was the first statutory protection for same-sex couples in Sweden. Unlike common-law marriage, this relationship status is legally recognized at the moment when two people enter a "marriage-like" relationship, which makes the couple eligible for other rights and benefits. Specifically, the protections apply when two persons begin to reside together in a joint home and live together as a couple in a presumptively permanent, sexual and cohabiting relationship. It ensures that the couples may legally contract for how their protected common property will be divided before any eventual separation and that an equal division of that property will be presumed in the absence of establishing different ownership shares. Each member of the couple is referred to in a gender-neutral manner as a sambo as shorthand for persons who live together (bor tillsammans). From 1988 to 2003, there were two different laws governing cohabiting couples' rights, one for heterosexual couples and one for same-sex couples. These separate laws were united into a single law in the Sambolag ("Cohabitees Act"), which took effect in July 2003.

The legal status provides only limited rights primarily to economic protection for joint ownership of the common home and household goods, though other benefits and obligations now also extend to sambo relationships. Subsidized assisted reproduction, for example, is available to such couples and also requires the partner's consent. Many of the limitations of this protection, however, were stark for same-sex couples before the recognition of same-sex marriage and registered partnerships, as they did not have options for greater protection through a more robust, legally protected status. The couples' status of being in a sambo relationship, for example, does not entitle the surviving partner to inherit the property of the deceased partner; rather, the surviving partner must request the division of the common home and household goods against the deceased partner's heirs. Consequently, the surviving sambo receives only half of the statutory sum that is granted to widows and widowers when their spouses will their estate to other persons, whereas the inheritance and the deceased sambo's estate instead pass to that person's children, parents or other blood relations when they do not provide for the surviving sambo though a will. While married couples have presumptive protections for the common home as well as all other property and income acquired during the marriage, same-sex sambor only receive the protection of the shared residence and household goods that were purposely intended and acquired for common use by the couple. This limitation remains today for such relationships regardless of the gender of the partners. The relationship status has evolved, however, as persons in such relationships formerly could not adopt their partner's children but can now do so under the current Children and Parents Code (Föräldrabalken). The cohabitation relationship status is also open to non-Swedes, which means that one does not have to be married to move to Sweden to live with one's partner.

Registered partnerships
Registered partnerships were legalised in Sweden in 1995. A law to this effect was approved by the Swedish Parliament in June 1994 by a vote of 171–141, promulgated on 23 June, and took effect on 1 January 1995. Sweden was the third country in the world to legally recognise same-sex unions, after Denmark and Norway.

Registered partnerships, only available to same-sex couples, gave the full range of protections, responsibilities and benefits as marriage, including adoption and arrangements for the breakdown of the relationship. Same-sex registered partners were granted the right to adopt jointly in 2003, and in vitro fertilisation for lesbian couples was allowed in 2005. Non-Swedes who were legally resident in Sweden had the right to enter into registered partnerships from 2000. The main distinction between registered partnership and marriage was that they were covered by separate laws, and that same-sex partnerships were a civil matter and could not be conducted through the church authority. LGBT groups advocated for a gender-neutral marriage law which would state that marriage can be conducted solely by the state, as is done in several other countries, rather than the current system in which churches have the authority to (legally) marry couples, because this would further the separation of church and state.

Marriage
In 2004, Parliament established a committee to investigate the possibility of opening marriage to same-sex partners. The report, issued in March 2007, supported enacting a gender-neutral marriage law and abolishing the registered partnership law (registered partnerships would be automatically converted into marriages) while granting an "opt-out" to religious institutions, which would allow them to refuse to marry same-sex couples. This last point was quite controversial and increased calls for a gender-neutral marriage law. The committee further suggested that the Swedish Government bring the changes into effect by 1 January 2008.

Six of the seven political parties in the Riksdag were in favour of such a reform. These were the Left Party, the Greens, the Social Democrats, the Liberal People's Party, the Moderate Party and the Centre Party. The Christian Democrats opposed the idea, while the liberal conservative Moderates signed on their support at their party congress in 2007. The majority of Swedes approved of same-sex marriage, but there was some strong opposition from religious organisations and other self-described "family-oriented" groups. Many complained about the slowly advancing governmental process of changing partnership into marriage, especially as the two types of unions were already essentially the same and many considered the change inevitable and natural. Supporters said there is no validity in the argument that same-sex marriage would threaten opposite-sex marriage because a gender-neutral marriage law would have no greater impact on society than the partnership law and argued it was simply a matter of principle and equality. For the opposition, they saw it as a threat to the symbolic value of marriage.

Legal challenge
On 12 May 2008, media sources reported that a married same-sex couple from Canada were challenging the Swedish Government in court because it refused to recognise their relationship as a marriage. Although a lower court, including the Court of Appeals, refused to hear the case, Sweden's highest administrative court, the Supreme Administrative Court, agreed to hear the case. The couple argued that a same-sex marriage entered into in accordance with Canadian law should be recognised in Sweden, despite the fact that there was no legal basis for it under then Swedish law. On 18 December 2008, the court ruled that the Swedish Tax Authority did not break any rules as the definition of marriage under Swedish law was at the time the union of one man and one woman, and that same-sex relationships were to be recognised as a registered partnership.

Vote in the Riksdag

The Reinfeldt Cabinet consisted of the Moderate Party, the Centre Party, the Liberal People's Party and the Christian Democratic Party. Justice Minister Beatrice Ask reacted positively when the committee presented its report in March 2007. How the legalisation would end was not clear as one of the coalition partners—the Christian Democrats—was against it. The leader of the Social Democratic Party, Mona Sahlin, said that the party would put forward its own bill in the Parliament if the cabinet could not unite on the issue. In early October 2007, the Green Party, the Left Party and the Social Democratic Party said they would join forces to introduce an opposition motion in Parliament to legalize same-sex marriage.

On 27 October 2007, the Moderate Party formally backed same-sex marriages, meaning that the Christian Democrats would be the only party to oppose the law. Göran Hägglund, the leader of the Christian Democrats, said on Sveriges Radio, "my position is that I have been tasked by the party to argue that marriage is for men and women. … When we discuss it between parties we are naturally open and sensitive to each other's arguments and we'll see if we can find a line that allows us to come together." On 14 January 2008, two leading politicians from the Christian Democrats took a position against the party and started to support same-sex marriage.

On 12 December 2007, the Church of Sweden voted to support the introduction of civil marriage for same-sex couples, but recommended that the term marriage be restricted to opposite-sex couples in the church. It was asked by the cabinet for its opinion on the matter before the introduction of legislation in early 2008. "Marriage and (same-sex) partnerships are equivalent forms of unions. Therefore the Church of Sweden's central board says yes to the proposal to join the legislation for marriages and partnerships into a single law," the Church said in a statement. "According to the Church of Sweden's board the word 'marriage' should, however, only be used for the relationship between a woman and a man.", it said.

Reports suggested the cabinet would table its same-sex marriage bill in early 2008; however, it had yet to propose a bill. This was likely due to the Christian Democrats' opposition from within the four-party centre-right governing coalition despite being the only party opposing the move. After negotiations on a compromise broke down and facing a parliamentary ultimatum in late October 2008, the cabinet prepared to present its bill to a free vote. On 21 January 2009, legislation to amend the Marriage Code to define marriage as the union of "two spouses" was introduced to the Swedish Parliament. The bill was passed on 1 April by a vote of 261–22 with 16 abstentions. It was promulgated and published on 16 April, and took effect on 1 May. The bill was supported by all parties except the Christian Democrats and one member of the Centre Party.

The first same-sex couple to marry in Sweden was Alf Karlsson and Johan Lundqvist at Stockholm City Hall on 1 May 2009. The marriage ceremony was officiated by Green Party politician Maria Wetterstrand.

As of 2019, all the major parties represented in the Riksdag are in favour of same-sex marriage. However, the Sweden Democrats and the Christian Democrats are in favour of state-recognized same-sex marriage, while believing that religious organisations or individuals working within them (such as priests in the Church of Sweden) should be able to refuse to perform them.

Marriages in the Church of Sweden
In 2009, Eva Brunne was elected and consecrated as the Lutheran Bishop of Stockholm. She was the first lesbian bishop in the world and the first bishop of the Church of Sweden to be in a registered same-sex partnership.

On 22 October 2009, the Assembly of the Church of Sweden (which is no longer the state church) voted strongly in favour of giving its blessing to same-sex marriages, including the use of the term marriage. It was the first major church in Sweden to take this position on same-sex marriage. Archbishop of Uppsala Anders Wejryd commented that he was pleased with the decision. The second and third largest Christian denominations in the country, the Catholic Church and the Pentecostalist Movement of Sweden, commented that they were "disappointed" with the decision of the Church of Sweden. The Muslim Association of Sweden had already stated that no imams will marry same-sex couples. Prime Minister Stefan Löfven said in June 2017 that he does not believe a priest working for the Church of Sweden should be allowed to refuse to marry same-sex couples.

Besides the Church of Sweden, other smaller Christian denominations allow their congregations to solemnize same-sex marriages, including the Liberal Catholic Church, which performed the first religious same-sex wedding in Sweden in July 2009, and the Uniting Church in Sweden.

Royal same-sex weddings
In October 2021, Marshal Fredrik Wersäll confirmed that members of the Swedish royal family may enter into a same-sex marriage without having to forfeit the crown or lose their royal titles and privileges or their place in the line of succession. A Swedish prince or princess must have the government's consent to marry, but a same-sex marriage would not be treated any differently to an opposite-sex marriage. This followed a similar announcement concerning the Dutch royal family.

Impact
A study by the Danish Research Institute for Suicide Prevention, released in 2019, showed that the legalisation of same-sex marriage, as well as other supportive policies and legislation, had decreased the suicide rate among same-sex partners. The study, conducted in both Sweden and Denmark, found a 46% fall in suicides of people in same-sex unions between the periods 1989–2002 and 2003–2016, compared to 28% among heterosexual couples.

Statistics
In July 2013, Statistics Sweden (SCB) released estimates on the number of people who had married a partner of the same sex since marriage legalisation in 2009. The group found that in all jurisdictions of Sweden bar one (Stockholm County) more lesbian marriages had occurred than male same-sex marriages. As of July 2013, 4,521 women were married to another woman in Sweden, compared to 3,646 men in same-sex marriages. The odd figure for female marriages is due to SCB not including foreigners in the statistics. Most same-sex marriages took place in Stockholm County, Västra Götaland County, Skåne County and Uppsala County.

According to SCB, 12,158 people were in a same-sex marriage at the end of 2017; with 56% being women and 44% being men. SCB estimated that the average age of marriage for women in same-sex relationships was 34 years, while for men it was 41 years (compared to 34 and 36, respectively, for opposite-sex partners). Stockholm, Västra Götaland and Skåne counties registered the most same-sex marriages, while Gotland, Jämtland and Blekinge registered the fewest.

Public opinion
A Eurobarometer poll conducted in autumn 2006 found that 71% of Swedes supported legalising same-sex marriage, with a high of 87% in Stockholm County and a low of 58% in Jönköping County. This public approval was the second highest in the European Union at the time, behind the Netherlands.

A YouGov poll conducted between 27 December 2012 and 6 January 2013 found that 79% of Swedes supported same-sex marriage, 14% were opposed and 7% had no opinion. A May 2013 Ipsos poll found that 81% of respondents were in favour of same-sex marriage and another 9% supported other forms of recognition for same-sex couples.
 
The 2015 Eurobarometer found that 90% of Swedes thought same-sex marriage should be allowed throughout Europe, while 7% were opposed.

A Pew Research Center poll, conducted between April and August 2017 and published in May 2018, showed that 88% of Swedes supported same-sex marriage, 7% were opposed and 5% did not know or refused to answer. When divided by religion, 94% of religiously unaffiliated people, 90% of non-practicing Christians and 65% of church-attending Christians supported same-sex marriage. Opposition was 5% among 18–34-year-olds.

The 2019 Eurobarometer found that 92% of Swedes thought same-sex marriage should be allowed throughout Europe, while 6% were opposed.

See also

 LGBT rights in Sweden
 Recognition of same-sex unions in Europe

Notes

References

External links
 Lag om ändring i äktenskapsbalken. Sveriges digitala lagbok (in Swedish)
 Video of the vote in the Riksdag. Sveriges Riksdag (in Swedish)

LGBT rights in Sweden
Marriage, unions and partnerships in Sweden
Sweden
Church of Sweden
2009 introductions
2009 in LGBT history